Schnorrer (שנאָרער; also spelled shnorrer) is a Yiddish term meaning "beggar" or "sponger".

English language usage
The English language usage of the word denotes a sly chiseler who will get money out of his acquaintances any way he can, often through an air of entitlement. A schnorrer is distinguished from an ordinary beggar by dint of his boundless chutzpah. Like "moocher", "schnorrer" does not apply to direct begging or destitution, but rather a habit of getting things (food, tools) by politely or insistently borrowing them with no intention of return.

Historical
A big number of beggars resulted in Poland after Chmielnicki's pogroms, when many households were destroyed. Schnorrers  begged for themselves, for dowries of poor brides (Hakhnasat Kallah); a practice which was allowed even when it disrupted the public study of the Torah, or for the restoration of a burned down household.

In film and literature 
Israel Zangwill's 1894  picaresque novel The King of Schnorrers 
Bernard Herrmann wrote a musical comedy based on Zangwill's novel, which run on Broadway for a short time in 1979
The comedian Jackie Mason often pokes fun at the stereotype of Jews as schnorrers.
Father Phil in Season 1 of The Sopranos often refers to himself as a "schnorrer," going to parishioner's homes to eat their home cooking, commonly, Carmela Soprano. He defines a "schnorrer" as "Somebody who always shows up in time for free grub." He attributes this language to growing up in Yonkers, NY, among many Jewish people.  
Jerry Seinfeld in season 11 episode 08 of Comedians in Cars Getting Coffee, Martin Short asks Seinfeld what he thinks is the funniest Jewish word, and Seinfeld responds, "It might be 'schnorrer', which he defines as “someone who picks the cashews out of the mixed nuts.”
Larry David tells Ted Danson he should chip in for a private plane to avoid being considered a schnorrer in season 10 episode 04 of Curb Your Enthusiasm.

References 

Stock characters
Pejorative terms for people
Jewish comedy and humor
Yiddish words and phrases
German words and phrases
Beggars